{{DISPLAYTITLE:(86047) 1999 OY3}}

, also written as (86047) 1999 OY3, is a trans-Neptunian object that resides in the Kuiper belt beyond Pluto. It was discovered on July 18, 1999, at the Mauna Kea Observatory, Hawaii, USA.

Haumea family
 is a candidate member of the Haumea family and probably has a very high albedo.

Of the known Haumea-family members,  has the dimmest absolute magnitude (H) of the group at 6.8, suggesting that it is also the smallest member of the group.

References

External links 
 

Haumea family
Classical Kuiper belt objects
Discoveries by the Mauna Kea Observatories
19990718